James Webb III (born August 19, 1993) is an American professional basketball player for Valencia of the Spanish Liga ACB and the EuroLeague. He played college basketball for North Idaho College and Boise State University.

High school career
Webb played for Curtis Baptist High School for two years before transferring to The Oaks Virtual School where he averaged 23 points, nine rebounds and five assists per game while being named team MVP.

College career
Webb began his college career at North Idaho College where he appeared in all 31 games, including 17 starts. He averaged 9.2 points and 5.2 rebounds per game and helped the team reach a 26-5 record.

In his sophomore season, he transferred to Boise State University where he averaged 15.8 points, 9.1 rebounds and 1.4 steals as a junior, leading the Broncos in the first two categories. He was named Mountain West Player of the Week three times and earned First-Team All-MW honors.

On March 27, 2016, Webb announced he would forego his senior season to declare for the NBA draft.

Professional career

Delaware 87ers (2016–2018)

After going undrafted in the 2016 NBA draft, Webb joined the Philadelphia 76ers for the 2016 NBA Summer League. On July 8, 2016, he signed with the 76ers, but was waived on October 24 after appearing in six preseason games. Five days later, he was acquired by the Delaware 87ers of the NBA Development League as an affiliate player of the 76ers. On March 7, 2017, Webb was waived after suffering a season ending ankle injury.

Webb was re-signed by the Delaware 87ers of the NBA Development League for the 2017–18 season.

Brooklyn Nets (2018)
On January 15, 2018, Webb was signed by the Brooklyn Nets to a Two-way contract.

Telekom Baskets Bonn (2018–2019)
On August 23, 2018, Webb was signed by Telekom Baskets Bonn of the Basketball Bundesliga.

Iowa Wolves (2019–2020)
On November 15, 2019, the Iowa Wolves announced that they had acquired the returning player right to Webb. Webb had 20 points, 14 rebounds and two assists on January 20, 2020 versus the Greensboro Swarm. He averaged 13.8 points, 8.1 rebounds and 1.8 assists per game.

Larisa (2020–2021)
On September 8, 2020, Webb signed overseas with Larisa of the Greek Basket League. In 13 games, he averaged 13.3 points and 9.6 rebounds per contest, attracting the interest of bigger clubs.

Murcia (2021–2022)
On January 31, 2021, UCAM Murcia announced that Webb had joined their team until the end of the season. He re-signed with the club in the summer of 2021. During the 2021-2022 campaign, in 33 league games, Webb averaged 12.1 points and 5.4 rebounds per contest.

Valencia (2022–present)
On July 8, 2022, Webb signed a two-year contract with Valencia of the Liga ACB and the EuroLeague.

NBA career statistics

Regular season 

|-
| style="text-align:left;"| 
| style="text-align:left;"|Brooklyn
| 10 || 0 || 12.0 || .250 || .211 || – || 2.4 || .4 || .1 || .0 || 1.6
|- class="sortbottom"
| style="text-align:center;" colspan="2"| Career
| 10 || 0 || 12.0 || .250 || .211 || – || 2.4 || .4 || .1 || .0 || 1.6

Personal life
On May 23, 2019, Webb and current Sacramento Kings center Richaun Holmes were arrested for possession of marijuana in the state of Florida.

References

External links
Boise State Broncos bio

1993 births
Living people
American expatriate basketball people in Germany
American expatriate basketball people in Greece
American expatriate basketball people in Spain
American men's basketball players
Basketball players from Augusta, Georgia
Boise State Broncos men's basketball players
Brooklyn Nets players
CB Murcia players
Delaware 87ers players
Iowa Wolves players
Junior college men's basketball players in the United States
Larisa B.C. players
Liga ACB players
Long Island Nets players
Power forwards (basketball)
Small forwards
Telekom Baskets Bonn players
Undrafted National Basketball Association players
United States men's national basketball team players
Valencia Basket players